Constituencies in France are used for purpose of elections.

Types 

 List of constituencies of the National Assembly of France
 European Parliament constituencies in France
 Constituencies for French residents overseas

See also 

 Electoral district

Politics of France
Constituencies of France